Kalimeris (or the Kalimeris asters) is a genus of plants in the family Asteraceae.

It was first described in 1825 by the French botanist Alexandre Henri Gabriel de Cassini (1781-1832).

This genus occurs mainly in eastern Asia (China, Korea and Japan), but is also naturalised on Hawaii.

They can grow to a height of 1-1.5 m. The foliage is herbaceous. The blue-green leaves vary per species and are smooth textured. They can be long and narrow, round with large teeth or lobed. The flower heads are solitary or in leafy flat-topped inflorescences. The disc florets are yellow, the ray florets are white, pink or purple.

The chromosome base number is  x = 9.  The genus's closest relatives are found in the Asian members of Aster and Heteropappus.

 Species

References

Astereae
Asteraceae genera